Windows DVD Maker is a discontinued DVD authoring application developed by Microsoft introduced in Windows Vista, available in the Home Premium and Ultimate editions of Windows Vista for users to create slideshows and videos for playback on media devices including DVD players and the Xbox 360 home video game console.  It is also available in the Home Premium, Professional, Enterprise, and Ultimate editions of Windows 7, but it is no longer available as of the release of Windows 8.

DVD Maker features an Aero Wizard-style user interface and includes customizable effects and transitions for slide shows and videos, which are Direct3D hardware accelerated and require the Windows Display Driver Model. Developers can create new effects, styles, and transitions through a software development kit, which include options for project user interface personalization. DVD Maker includes a number of command line options and integrates with other applications in Windows Vista including Windows Media Center, Windows Media Player, Windows Movie Maker, and Windows Photo Gallery. DVD Maker—as well as Windows Media Center and Windows Media Player—can be removed from Windows 7, where Windows Movie Maker is also no longer available in favor of Windows Essentials.

History
DVD Maker was reported by Paul Thurrott during the WinHEC 2003, who said Windows Vista (codenamed "Longhorn") would support DVD movie creation "through an independent application, and not through the shell." This detail was accompanied by reports that Windows Vista would also support all major DVD packet writing formats such as Mount Rainier, and would eliminate the "staging and burning" steps while writing to optical media—files copied to optical media could instead be written immediately, or managed later—making DVDs equivalent to flash storage. The Live File System enables this latter feature.

DVD Maker is available in Windows 7 as an optional application installed by default; it is no longer available as of the release of Windows 8.

Features
Windows DVD Maker is available on Home Premium, Enterprise and Ultimate editions of Windows Vista, as well as Home Premium, Professional, Enterprise and Ultimate editions of Windows 7. It has a simple user interface, which takes the user through the process of creating DVD-Video. The first step involves importing video files, arranging them to play in proper order. Windows DVD Maker automatically splits the videos into scenes that can be accessed from a special scene selection page in the DVD menu. In the next step, animated DVD menus can be added to the compilation. Windows DVD Maker can also add a slide show of pictures with a musical accompaniment and transition effects. Many of these are similar to the transition effects available in Windows Movie Maker. Users can also customize the font and button styles. The application can show an interactive preview of what the DVD will look and act like when it has been burned. For example, users can navigate the DVD menus, testing them.

Windows DVD Maker is designed to encode video as background process with reduced scheduling priority to ensure the computer remains responsive during the compilation process.

See also
Features new to Windows Vista
List of features removed in Windows 8
List of DVD authoring applications

References

2006 software
Discontinued Windows components
Optical disc authoring software
DVD Maker
Windows 7